Yasmine Amhis (born 1982, Algiers) is a French-Algerian particle physicist. In 2016, she was awarded the Jacques Herbrand Prize. She is the granddaughter of the Algerian poet and writer Djoher Amhis-Ouksel.

Early life and education
In 1999, after high school in Algeria, Yasmine Amhis pursued undergraduate studies in France. She obtained her master's degree at the University of Paris-Sud in Orsay, then earned a thesis grant in 2006 and started her work at  IJCLab Orsay under the supervision of Marie -Hélène Schune and Jacques Lefrançois. Work on her thesis introduced her to the LHCb experiment at CERN. After she obtained her PhD, she moved to Switzerland for a three-year postdoctoral position at the École Polytechnique Fédérale de Lausanne.

Career
In 2012, she obtained a permanent research scientist position at CNRS.  Her outstanding academic career was published by Campus France, France Alumni, in 2017.

Amhis has devoted her research to topics related to the "bottom-quark" baryon, topics she reviewed in 2017 and 2022. In 2016, she was awarded the Jacques-Herbrand prize by the French Academy of Sciences Given her expertise and her commitment to the LHCb experiment, a collaboration of more than 1,000 scientists, she was elected in April 2022 to the strategic position of "physics coordinator".

Engagements 
Given her background and origins, Amhis, involved naturally with other physicists from the African diaspora to the development of science for developing countries. She engaged in the initiative of the  "African Strategy for Fundamental and Applied Physics" (ASFAP) founded in 2020 by  among others, Fairouz Malek and Ketevi Assamagan. Up to 2022, she coordinated the group responsible for the strategy in particle and astroparticle physics.

Publications 
Amhis is the author or co-author of more than 600 articles, most of them related to the LHCb experiment. Among all of these articles, 14 have been cited more than 500 times

Awards 
In 2016, Amhis received the Jacques-Herbrand prize from the French Academy of Sciences.

References

External links 
Yasmine Amhis's website

Living people
1982 births
People from Algiers
21st-century French physicists
21st-century Algerian physicists
French women physicists
Algerian women physicists
French people of Algerian descent
Particle physicists
Paris-Sud University alumni
Academic staff of the École Polytechnique Fédérale de Lausanne